Ragna Ahlbäck (1914 – 2002) was a Finnish ethnographer and archivist.

Early life 
Ragna Ulrica Ahlbäck (née Nikander) was born 17 July 1914 in Porvoo. She grew up in Turku where her father, cultural historian and professor Gabriel Nikander, taught at Åbo Akademi University. Niklander completed her doctoral dissertation in 1955. "Kökar: näringslivet och dess organisation i en utskärssocken" established her as a pioneer in the area of Nordic studies.

Family life 
Ragna married the linguist Olav Ahlback. The couple had a son, Tore, who became a theologian and librarian.

Career
Ahlbäck served over 44 years as archivist for Svenska Litteratursällskapet Finland, the Swedish Literature Society's folklore archive in Finland. She began her professional work in 1937, which included field work throughout Finland, and later, Sweden. In 1965 she moved to Malax where she founded the Kvarken Boat Museum with her husband.

Later life 
Alback died in Pargas on 6 September 2002. Her extensive research archives, including a number of films from the 1950s and 1960s featuring traditional farming and fishing practices, are held at the Swedish Literature Society archives.

Bibliography

References

External links
News article featuring women who contributed to the Swedish Literature Society
Short feature on YouTube
Ragna Ahlback (in Swedish)

Female archivists
Finnish ethnographers
1914 births
2002 deaths